Can't Slow Down is the debut album by American rock band Saves the Day, released on August 11, 1998, by Equal Vision Records.

Background
Saves the Day formed in late 1997.

Recording
The album was produced by Steve Evetts purely because Evetts had previously worked with Lifetime – a band vocalist Chris Conley loved. It was recorded during the winter break of Conley's senior year of high school, and released after the band graduated from high school. This album was the bass guitar player Sean McGrath's only recording with Saves the Day. (He is also responsible for changing the band's name from Sefler to Saves the Day.)

Unlike their later releases, this album has a melodic hardcore sound, sharing the same sound of other bands like 7 Seconds and Lifetime.

Release
Saves the Day went on their first full tour of U.S. with Bane. Can't Slow Down was released by Equal Vision Records on August 11, 1998. McGrath came up with the title of the album, taking it from the Lionel Richie album of the same name. The album sold 8,000 copies by the time Through Being Cool (1999) was released.

"Three Miles Down" inspired the band to record I'm Sorry I'm Leaving after a fan who was also an employee at Equal Vision suggested that they make an acoustic EP after hearing the song.

Track listing 
All songs written by Chris Conley.

 "Deciding" – 1:55
 "The Choke" – 2:35
 "Handsome Boy" – 1:01
 "Blindfolded" – 3:13
 "Collision" – 1:25
 "Three Miles Down" – 1:36
 "Always Ten Feet Tall" – 3:25
 "Nebraska Bricks" – 2:04
 "Seeing It This Way" – 1:31
 "Hot Time in Delaware" – 1:45
 "Houses and Billboards" – 3:12
 "Obsolete" – 1:57
 "Sometimes, New Jersey" – 1:09
 "Jodie" – 4:36

Personnel
Personnel per booklet.

Saves the Day
 Anthony Anastasio – guitars
 Sean McGrath – bass
 Chris Conley – vocals
 Bryan Newman – drums
 Justin Gaylord – guitars

Production
 Steve Evetts – producer
 Alan Douches – mastering
 Jonathan Williams – cover photo
 Justine Demetrick – band photo
 Saves the Day – design
 Sean Mallinson – artwork, design

References

External links

Can't Slow Down at MySpace (streamed copy where licensed)

Saves the Day albums
1998 debut albums
Equal Vision Records albums
Albums produced by Steve Evetts